Rahanna Alicia Juman is an ecologist and author who specializes on the wetlands of Trinidad and Tobago.

Education and awards 
Juman has a PhD in Zoology from The University of the West Indies.

She has been awarded several post-doctoral fellowships, including the University of Washington's Hubert H. Humphrey fellowship 2010 to 2011.

In 2002, Juman was awarded a $10,000 prize from the from the L'Oréal-UNESCO For Women in Science Awards.

Career 
Juman researches seagrass beds and mangrove forests.

Juman is the Head of the Environmental Research Program and a Senior Research Officer at the Institute of Marine Affairs in Trinidad and Tobago.

Selected publications 

 Juman, Rahanna A. Wetlands of Trinidad & Tobago, 2010, Prospect Press, ISBN 9789769508262
 Juman, Rahanna A. The structure and productivity of the Thalassia testudinum community in Bon Accord Lagoon, Tobago. Revista de Biología Tropical 53 (2005): 219–227.

References

External links 
 Institute of Marine Affairs, Trinidad and Tobago

Living people
University of the West Indies alumni
Trinidad and Tobago academics
Trinidad and Tobago women scientists
Trinidad and Tobago ecologists
L'Oréal-UNESCO Awards for Women in Science laureates
21st-century Trinidad and Tobago women
Trinidad and Tobago women writers
Year of birth missing (living people)